The Honda Shadow VT600C, also known as the Honda Shadow VLX, is a cruiser motorcycle made by Honda from 1988 through 2008. It has a  liquid cooled V-twin engine, a four-speed transmission, 35° rake, chain drive, and a single-shock softail-style rear suspension.  The VLX engine is borrowed from the Honda Transalp. The VLX is the initials for V-twin and lowered, and an X for extended rake. The Honda Shadow VT600C was also produced in Brazil from 1998 to 2005. Brazilian model Honda Shadow VLX has a five-speed transmission. Motorcyclist magazine's Aaron P. Frank included the Shadow VTX in a 2003 list of "America's 50 best bikes used", saying no better middleweight cruiser could be had for $3,500, and that the engine "is asthmatic, but runs forever".

References

VT600C
Cruiser motorcycles
Motorcycles introduced in 1988
Motorcycles powered by V engines